Dracocephalum thymiflorum is a species of flowering plant belonging to the family Lamiaceae.

Its native range is Bulgaria to Southern Siberia and Iran.

References

thymiflorum